The eleventh season of the Australian police-drama Blue Heelers premiered on the Seven Network on 4 February 2004 and aired on Wednesday nights at 8:30 PM. The 39-episode season concluded 5 November 2004.

Overview
The programme suffered along with the Seven Networks as a whole; its ratings in a dire state. 2004 became the year in which the producers took a radical approach to shake-up their show. The 39-episode 11th season saw the programme start the year closer to the wrong end of the weekly top 50 - and sometimes out of it altogether. However, when storylines heated up towards June/July - the numbers did too - and the programme enjoyed an amicable ratings performance thereon in 2005.
On 21 April 2004 Blue Heelers aired a special event: a live episode. While Paul Bishop did not appear due to film commitments, this theatre-esque event drew large ratings and was the first step made in attempting to draw viewers back to the show. The broadcast hit nearly 1.6 million viewers in April, helping Seven to narrowly win the No. 1 spot for the night; but it failed to resurrect the numbers for the show as Seven had hoped.

This was followed by the overhaul of the show. Its 440th episode, "End of Innocence", aired on 6 July 2004 and saw a new family in town being suspected of ghastly crimes. The Baxter family terrorised Clancy, Jo, Tom and Grace, and shortly thereafter the terror became reality when the station was blown up and Clancy and Jo were killed. Soon after, Grace was found raped and murdered.

Nick Schultz, now in Homicide, returned to investigate, and soon learned that Tom had changed as a result of these events, and was now much harsher and determined to gain vengeance on the Baxters. Four new cops arrived on the scene - the smart Detective Senior Constable Amy Fox, family man Sergeant Mark Jacobs, and ambitious rival trainees, Probationary Constables Kelly O'Rourke and Joss Peroni (whose birthdays just happen to be on the same day). In episode 445, "Checkmate", Barry Baxter was sent to jail for the terror attacks, and Nick departed Mount Thomas leaving his colleagues to face their new situation. The ratings picked up significantly during this time.

In the final episodes of the season, a series of attempts on Tom's life saw him suspect Tarni Baxter (Melissa Andersen), the jailed Baxter's daughter. Although there was no proof against her, the closing moments of the season finale saw a crazy-with-rage Tom attempting to drown Tarni in a river.

While some critics and fans were concerned at the new soap opera style that Blue Heelers had embraced, ratings remained high for the rest of the season.this season saw the old opening credits be taken out in order to put the new version with a whole new modern tone for the start of season 11 and 12,13

Main cast

Guest actors included Charles "Bud" Tingwell, Nicki Paull, Bernard Curry, Lesley Baker, Eliza Taylor-Cotter, Danny Adcock, Alan Hopgood, Daniela Duspara, Frankie J. Holden, Simon Westaway, Luke Hemsworth and Jeremy Lindsay Taylor.

Reception

The show started the season with new opening credits for the modern tone set for the season and a (Live) episode. Midway through the year the show had a revamp, blowing up the station, killing off recurring character Clancy Freeman and the popular cast regular Jo Parrish. Following Jo's death 4 new cast members were added. Also a (brief) return of Nick Schultz for five episodes 441-445 all about the bombing of the station and cop a being in the blast with a handicap man. The character of Ben Stewart also departed the show a few months later.

Show had an average of 1.4 Million until the Revamp began which spiked up the rating to a weekly 1.6 Million Rating

Awards

Episodes

DVD release
Season 11 Parts 1 and 2 was released on 5 August 2010.

References

General
 Zuk, T. Blue Heelers: 2004 episode guide, Australian Television Information Archive. Retrieved 1 August 2007.
 TV.com editors. Blue Heelers Episode Guide - Season 11, TV.com. Retrieved 1 August 2007.
Specific

Blue Heelers seasons
2004 Australian television seasons